İliç (from , Lichk) is a town and district of Erzincan Province in the Eastern Anatolia Region of Turkey. It covers an area of 1,397 km² and the elevation is 1,060 m. The district has a population of 6,349 of which 2,503 live in the town of İliç (2010). The mayor is Muhlis Doğan (MHP). Muhammet Ali Paşa of Egypt's ancestors came from this city before they migrated to Kavala.

The town is just upstream of the Bağıştaş 1 Dam.

Etymology

The name "İliç" comes from the towns former Armenian name "Լիճք" (Lichk), meaning lakes. It was called so because of the lakes formed from the water of overflowing springs.

Sights
 Zinegar (Zimera) ruins
 Karabaş church
 Pasha kiosk
 Clock fountain (town center)
 Central church (town center)

Notable people
Hamdi Ulukaya, founder of Chobani, born here
Mustafa Sarıgül writer, entrepreneur and politician.

Ezhel, rap-artist.His grandparents born here.

References

External links
 District governor's official website 
 World Gazetteer: Information on İliç

Populated places in Erzincan Province
Districts of Erzincan Province